Cataract Peak is a summit located in Banff National Park in Alberta, Canada.

Cataract Peak was so named on account of a nearby waterfall, or cataract.

Geology
Like other mountains in Banff Park, Cataract Peak is composed of sedimentary rock laid down during the Precambrian to Jurassic periods. Formed in shallow seas, this sedimentary rock was pushed east and over the top of younger rock during the Laramide orogeny.

Climate
Based on the Köppen climate classification, Cataract Peak is located in a subarctic climate zone with cold, snowy winters, and mild summers.

References

Three-thousanders of Alberta
Alberta's Rockies
Mountains of Banff National Park